Neame is a surname which may refer to:

Basil Neame (1921–2010), English fruit grower
Christopher Neame (born 1947), English actor
Christopher Neame (writer/producer) (1942–2011), British film producer and screenwriter 
Douglas Neame (1901–1988), English hurdler
Gareth Neame (born 1967), British television producer and executive
Ivo Neame (born 1981), British jazz pianist and saxophonist
Philip Neame (1888–1978), British Army lieutenant general and recipient of the Victoria Cross
Rex Neame (1936–2008), English cricketer
Ronald Neame (1911–2010), English film cinematographer, producer, screenwriter and director
Stuart Neame, rugby union international who represented England from 1879 to 1880